"Must be now" is the 13th single by Japanese idol girl group NMB48. It was released on October 7, 2015. It was number-one on the Oricon Weekly Singles Chart with 307,036 copies sold. It was the second best-selling single in Japan in October 2015, with 326,308 copies. It was also the eighteenth best-selling single of 2015 in Japan according to the Oricon Yearly Singles Chart, with 386,320 copies sold. As of February 22, 2016 it had sold 414,015 copies. It was also number-one on the Billboard Japan Hot 100.

An alternative dance shot version with full-size song was published on YouTube.

Track listing

Type-A

Type-B

Type-C

Charts

Year-end charts

References

2015 singles
2015 songs
Japanese-language songs
NMB48 songs
Oricon Weekly number-one singles
Billboard Japan Hot 100 number-one singles